Aqajan-e Tavakkol (also Romanized as Āqājān-e Tavakkol; also known as Āqājān-e Tavakkolī) is a village in Doshman Ziari Rural District, Doshman Ziari District, Mamasani County, Fars Province, Iran. At the 2006 census, its population was 42, in 8 families.

References 

Populated places in Mamasani County